Gamesphere refers to several fictitious video game consoles:

GameSphere, from the Drake & Josh episode "The Bet"
Okama Gamesphere, from the South Park episode, "Towelie"